This is a list of Croatian television related events from 2013.

Events
6 May - Žarko Stojanović from Serbia, a housemate on the fifth season of the French version of Big Brother Secret Story wins the fifth and final season of Veliki brat.
21 December - Mamutica actor Mislav Čavajda and his partner Petra Jeričević win the eighth and final season of Ples sa zvijezdama.

Debuts

Television shows

Ending this year
Ples sa zvijezdama (2006-2013)
Veliki brat (2011-2013, 2015–present)

Births

Deaths

See also
2013 in Croatia